Peres Jepchirchir (born 27 September 1993) is a Kenyan professional long-distance runner who competes mainly in road running competitions. She won the gold medal in the women's marathon at the 2020 Tokyo Olympics. Jepchirchir was the champion at the 2016 World Half Marathon Championships and again at the 2020 World Half Marathon Championships.

Her best time for the half marathon of 1:05:06, set on 10 February 2017 in UAE, is a former half marathon world record. She holds the women's only half marathon world record of 1:05:16 set at the 2020 World Half Marathon Championships in Gdynia, Poland, which was an improvement on her own previous record.

Career
Jepchirchir ran track while at school and was spurred on by the achievements of Mary Keitany, who was a world half marathon champion at the time. She began to compete in road races in 2013, starting with two wins at 10K runs in South Africa, then a third-place finish at the Kisumu Marathon in her native Kenya, finishing the distance in 2:47:33 hours. She turned to cross country running at the start of 2014 and managed to take second place to Faith Kipyegon at the Kenyan Cross Country Championships – her first significant finish at national level.

Her talent was spotted by Gianni Demadonna's team and she began to earn invitations to high level European road races. She won three straight races in France in late 2014, winning the Le Lion Half Marathon (in a course record of 69:12 minutes), the Marseille-Cassis Classique Internationale, then the Corrida de Houilles. She was narrowly runner-up to Janet Kisa at the end-of-year BOclassic 5K.

She made her highest profile appearance yet at the 2015 London Marathon, but failed to build on her shorter distance achievements, as she could not finish the full marathon distance. However, she began to reach the peaks of road running in 10K and half marathon that year. Her best of 30:55 minutes at the Prague Grand Prix was the second fastest globally for the season and one week later she set a course record of 67:17 minutes to win the Ústí nad Labem Half Marathon – a time which placed her seventh on the year's top lists. She also defended her title in Marseille in October.

Jepchirchir set a new best of 66:39 minutes at the 2016 Ras Al Khaimah Half Marathon. Despite the fast time, which moved her to 13th on the all-time lists, the strength in depth of the race left her in fourth some way behind winner Cynthia Cherotich Limo while six women ran quicker than 67 minutes (a first for the sport). This performance earned her a place on the Kenyan team for the 2016 IAAF World Half Marathon Championships. The five-woman team led out the start of the race, with Ethiopia's Netsanet Gudeta and Genet Yalew also in contention. As the race progressed, this was whittled down to a Kenyan trio of Jepchirchir, Limo and Mary Wacera Ngugi, and this eventually resulted in a sprint finish between Limo and Jepchirchir. Despite having been among the least experienced and well-known of the Kenyan team, it was Jepchirchir who emerged as world champion, finishing the race in 67:31 minutes and leading the Kenyan women to the team title and a podium sweep with Limo and Ngugi.

A course record came at the Yangzhou Jianzhen International Half Marathon in April, with her run of 67:21 minutes. At the 2017 RAK Half Marathon she broke two world records. She took three seconds off Florence Kiplagat's half marathon record in 65:06 minutes and set the 20K world record at 61:40 minutes. Her position as the world's best was short-lived, however, as Joyciline Jepkosgei (third at the RAK race) broke both her world records the following month.

In the 2020 Summer Olympics, she won the gold medal in a time of 2:27.20, given to her by Thomas Bach. She won the 2021 New York City Marathon with a time of 2:22:39, becoming the first person to win the Olympic gold medal and the New York City Marathon in the same year. She won the 2022 Boston Marathon with a time of 2:21:02. Due to her hip injury, Jepchirchir had to miss the 2022 World Athletics Championships in Oregon.

International competitions

Road race wins
 Bangalore World 10K: 2016
 Corrida de Houilles 10K: 2014
 Durban 10K Cityrun: 2013 (2)
 Marseille-Cassis Classique Internationale 20K: 2014, 2015
 Montbéliard-Belfort Le Lion Half Marathon: 2014
 Ottawa 10K: 2016
 Portugal Half Marathon: 2019
 Prague Grand Prix 10K: 2015
 Prague Half Marathon: 2020
 Ras Al Khaimah Half Marathon: 2017
 Saitama International Marathon: 2019
 Ústí nad Labem Half Marathon: 2015,2016
 Valencia Half Marathon: 2016
 Valencia Marathon: 2020
 Yangzhou Jianzhen International Half Marathon: 2016

Personal bests
 5K run – 15:51 (Bolzano 2014)
 10K run – 30:55 (Prague 2015)
 Half marathon – 1:05:06 (Ras Al Khaimah 2017)
 Marathon – 2:17:16 (Valencia 2020)

References

External links

All Athletics profile

Living people
1993 births
Kenyan female long-distance runners
Kenyan female marathon runners
World Athletics Half Marathon Championships winners
World record setters in athletics (track and field)
Athletes (track and field) at the 2020 Summer Olympics
Medalists at the 2020 Summer Olympics
Olympic gold medalists in athletics (track and field)
Olympic gold medalists for Kenya
Olympic athletes of Kenya
New York City Marathon female winners
Boston Marathon female winners
21st-century Kenyan women
20th-century Kenyan women